Marc-Antoine Pouliot (born May 22, 1985) is a Canadian-Swiss professional ice hockey player who is currently playing with Genève-Servette HC of the National League (NL). He was selected 22nd overall by the Edmonton Oilers in the 2003 NHL Entry Draft.

Playing career

Junior
As a youth, Pouliot played in the 1998 and 1999 Quebec International Pee-Wee Hockey Tournaments with a minor ice hockey team from Quebec City.

Pouliot spent his junior career with the Rimouski Océanic of the Quebec Major Junior Hockey League (QMJHL). In addition to playing for Canada's under-18 team in 2003, he spent two seasons as the captain of the Océanic. His final junior year was spent on a line with Sidney Crosby. Although naturally a centre, Pouliot switched to left-wing to allow Crosby to play his natural position.

Professional
After a relatively successful training camp with the Oilers, Pouliot was assigned to the Hamilton Bulldogs of the American Hockey League (AHL) where he made his professional debut. The Edmonton Oilers called him up to their team on March 13, 2006 and Pouliot was set to play on March 18, 2006 against the Red Wings, but was scratched when forward Ethan Moreau returned from a sprained ankle. He played just over 10 minutes in his first NHL game on March 30, 2006 with the Oilers against the Los Angeles Kings. He scored his first NHL goal four nights later on April 3 in Edmonton vs. the Phoenix Coyotes.

Splitting time between the Wilkes-Barre Penguins and the Oilers during the 2006–07 campaign, Pouliot scored four goals with seven assists for the Oilers. He would then split time with the Oilers and the Springfield Falcons during the 2007–08 season. In his first full season with the Oilers, Pouliot appeared in 63 games, recording 20 points.

On July 23, 2010, Pouliot signed a 1-year two-way deal with the Tampa Bay Lightning.

He was traded to the Phoenix Coyotes for a seventh round pick in the 2011 NHL Entry Draft on June 25, 2011. In the 2011–12 season, Pouliot started the year with affiliate the Portland Pirates. He appeared in 13 games for the Coyotes throughout the season before finding a regular fourth line role in the playoffs, appearing in a career high 8 games.

On June 1, 2012, Pouliot signed a one-year deal with EHC Biel of the National League A. Upon NHL interest with the option to leave the club before the 5th of July, Pouliot was later officially released as a free agent by the Coyotes on June 26.

After the conclusion of his first Swiss season in which he contributed with 40 points in 48 games, Pouliot returned to remain in the NLA, however signing a two-year deal with rivals HC Fribourg-Gottéron on May 17, 2013.

On May 13, 2021, Pouliot joined Genève-Servette HC on a one-year deal with an option for a second season.

Career statistics

Regular season and playoffs

International

References

External links

Prospect Report from Hockey's Future

1985 births
Living people
Canadian people of French descent
Canadian ice hockey centres
Edmonton Oilers draft picks
Edmonton Oilers players
EHC Biel players
French Quebecers
HC Fribourg-Gottéron players
Genève-Servette HC players
Hamilton Bulldogs (AHL) players
Ice hockey people from Quebec City
National Hockey League first-round draft picks
Norfolk Admirals players
Phoenix Coyotes players
Portland Pirates players
Rimouski Océanic players
Springfield Falcons players
Tampa Bay Lightning players
Wilkes-Barre/Scranton Penguins players
Canadian expatriate ice hockey players in Switzerland